Ministry of the Navy, Navy Ministry, Ministry for Naval Affairs or Naval Ministry can refer to one of the following cabinet departments charged with oversight of a country's naval forces:

 Ministry for Naval Affairs (Greece), 1822–1953
 Ministry for Naval Affairs (Sweden), 1840–1920
 Navy Ministry (Portugal), 1736–1982
 Ministry of the Navy (Italy), 1861–1947
 Ministry of the Navy (Japan), 1872–1945
 Ministry of the Navy (Russia), 1815–1917
 Ministry of the Navy (Spain), 1808–1977
 Ministry of the Navy (Turkey), 1924–1927
 Ministry of the Navy and Colonies, France, 1547–1947
 Ministry of Navy (Norway), Norway, 1815–1885
 Ministry of the Navy (Brazil), 1822-1999
 Prussian Naval Ministry, 1861–1871

See also 
 Admiralty (disambiguation)
 Navy Department (disambiguation)